Fairview Cemetery, also known as Citizens' Cemetery and Antioch Cemetery, is a historic cemetery located at Culpeper, Culpeper County, Virginia, United States.

History
It was established in 1855. The property includes a contributing mid-19th-century municipal cemetery, an early-20th-century African-American cemetery, a monument to Confederate dead (1881), an enclosure wall, and a caretaker's lodge.

It was listed on the National Register of Historic Places in 2006.

Notable people buried there include A.P. Hill (1825-1965), Confederate general, United States Congressmen John S. Barbour (1790–1855) and John Franklin Rixey (1854–1907).

References

External links
 

Cemeteries on the National Register of Historic Places in Virginia
National Register of Historic Places in Culpeper County, Virginia
1855 establishments in Virginia